North Pemberton is a disused railway station located in Pemberton Township, Burlington County, New Jersey, United States. The station was built in 1892 by John S. Rogers and added to the National Register of Historic Places on May 23, 1978. The station became inactive in 1969 when rail service between Pemberton and Camden ended. The Township of Pemberton now owns the station and operates it as the North Pemberton Railroad Station Museum, a museum of regional history and a Welcome and Information Center for both the Pinelands and the Pemberton area.

The North Pemberton Railroad Station Museum is currently closed and inaccessible. Pemberton Township Mayor David Patriarca, along with the town council were unable to negotiate a new lease for the site with the Pemberton Township Historic Trust in September 2012.

See also
Camden and Amboy Rail Road and Transportation Company
Operating Passenger Railroad Stations Thematic Resource (New Jersey)
National Register of Historic Places listings in Burlington County, New Jersey

References

External links
 North Pemberton Railroad Station Museum and Rail Trail - official site

Queen Anne architecture in New Jersey
Railway stations in the United States opened in 1892
Railway stations in Burlington County, New Jersey
Railway stations on the National Register of Historic Places in New Jersey
Former railway stations in New Jersey
Museums in Burlington County, New Jersey
History museums in New Jersey
Former Pennsylvania Railroad stations
National Register of Historic Places in Burlington County, New Jersey
Defunct museums in New Jersey
New Jersey Register of Historic Places
Pemberton Township, New Jersey
1892 establishments in New Jersey
Railroad museums in New Jersey